Presidential elections were held in Iran on 14 June 2013. Hassan Rouhani won with a landslide victory, elected in the first round of voting with 50.71% of the vote. Tehran Mayor Mohammad Bagher Ghalibaf finished second with 16.56% of the vote. Over 36.7 million Iranians voted, 72.71% of eligible voters.

The Guardian Council screened 680 registered candidates, approving eight to run in the election; Mohammad Bagher Ghalibaf, Gholam-Ali Haddad-Adel, Ali Akbar Velayati, Saeed Jalili, Mohsen Rezaee, Mohammad Gharazi, Hassan Rouhani and Mohammad Reza Aref. Haddad-Adel and Aref later withdrew from the race in the days leading up to the election. Incumbent President Mahmoud Ahmadinejad was not able to run for re-election as he was limited to two terms or 8 years in office under the Iranian constitution.

Electoral system

The President of Iran is the country's highest directly elected official, the chief of the executive branch, and the second most important position after the Supreme Leader. Duties are similar to heads of governments in other countries, except that the armed forces, Chief judiciary system, state television, and other key governmental organizations are under the control of the Supreme Leader of Iran. It is also an informal custom that cabinet ministers for sensitive departments like foreign relations and intelligence are coordinated with the Supreme Leader.

Any Iranian citizen born in Iran, believing in God and the official religion of Iran (Islam), who has always been loyal to the Constitution and is above 21 years of age may register as a presidential candidate. An institution called the Election Monitoring Agency (EMA) and managed by the Guardian Council vets registered candidates (in the 2009 election 36,000 people signed up as candidates) and selects a handful to run in the election. The Guardian Council does not announce publicly the reason for rejections of particular candidates although those reasons are explained to each candidate. Females who register as candidates have invariably been excluded from standing for election by the council.

Electoral law
One of the issues that has been raised in the pre-election debate over electoral reforms, especially regarding enforcement, situations of candidates. Executive of elections under previous law was ministry of interior (Government) and there were statements about changing of maintaining law. In addition, the law provided that the candidates must be political men and the meaning of men was not known. The changes began after the protests to the previous election. According to Iranian law, candidates more than 75 years old are eligible to run but their health issues must be checked by the Guardian Council.

The new act of the elections was approved by the parliament on 17 December 2012 and was signified by speaker of the parliament, Ali Larijani, to the president for official implementation. Some of the changes are explained:

Timeline
 7 May – The official registration of candidates began at the ministry of interior.
 11 May – The time for registration was ended at 18:00 IRDT.
 21 May – The final list of candidates was announced by the Minister of Interior, Mostafa Mohammad Najjar. A number of 8 candidates are eligible to participate in the election.
 24 May – Official propagation campaigns for the final candidates began.
 13 June – End of campaigns.
 14 June – Election date.
 15 June – Official results announced by Interior Ministry with Hassan Rouhani elected as the seventh President of Iran.
 25 June – Guardian Council confirmed the election results.
 1 August – President-elect met with Supreme Leader Ali Khamenei.
 3 August – Inauguration of new president, replacing Mahmoud Ahmadinejad.

Electoral Commission
For the first time in the history of Iranian presidential elections, a commission of eleven persons (three legal, seven experts, and one from parliament) supervised the elections.

Candidates

Registration for candidates took place from 7 to 11 May 2013. Registered candidates' qualifications were then reviewed by the Guardian Council. On 21 May 2013 eight candidates were approved for placement on the ballot. BBC News commented that all eight approved candidates were "considered hardline conservatives," with reformist candidates, notably former president Akbar Hashemi Rafsanjani, having been barred from standing. In contrast, Lebanon's Daily Star newspaper described attempts by former presidents Rafsanjani and Mohammad Khatami to unite behind one or the other of two "reformist candidates," Hassan Rouhani and Mohammad Reza Aref. Two of the eight, Aref and Gholam-Ali Haddad-Adel, withdrew from the race on 10 and 11 June.

Withdrawn

During the electoral campaign
The following two candidates registered for the election and their nominations were approved by the Guardian Council, but withdrew their candidacies during the electoral campaign.
 Mohammad Reza Aref, First Vice President (2001–2005) (endorsed Hassan Rouhani).
 Gholam-Ali Haddad-Adel, Speaker of the Parliament (2004–2008) (endorsed Conservative candidates; Progression Alliance).

Before the electoral campaign
The following candidates registered for the election campaign but withdrew their candidacies before the electoral campaign.

 Masoud Pezeshkian, Member of the Parliament (since 2008) (endorsed Akbar Hashemi Rafsanjani)
 Javad Etaat, Member of the Parliament (2000–2004) (endorsed Akbar Hashemi Rafsanjani)
 Ali Akbar Javanfekr, managing director of IRNA (2010–2013) (endorsed Esfandiar Rahim Mashaei)
 Mohammad-Reza Rahimi, First Vice President (2009-2013) (endorsed Esfandiar Rahim Mashaei)
 Ramin Mehmanparast, Deputy Minister of Foreign Affairs (2010–2013) (endorsed Mohammad Bagher Ghalibaf)
 Mohammad-Hassan Aboutorabi Fard, Deputy Speaker of the Parliament (2010–2011) (endorsed Manouchehr Mottaki)

 Sadeq Khalilian, Minister of Agricultural (2009-2013) (endorsed Esfandiar Rahim Mashaei)
 Mohammad Shariatmadari, Minister of Commerce (1997–2005) (endorsed Akbar Hashemi Rafsanjani)
 Davoud Ahmadinejad, Head of Presidential Commission (2005–2008) (endorsed Ali Akbar Velayati)
 Kamran Bagheri Lankarani, Minister of Health (2005–2009) (endorsed Saeed Jalili)
 Sadeq Vaeez Zadeh, Head of National Elites Foundation (2006–2009) (endorsed Mohammad Bagher Ghalibaf)
 Alireza Ali Ahmadi, Minister of Education (2006–2009) (endorsed Mohammad Bagher Ghalibaf)

Rejected
The following candidates registered for the election but their nominations were rejected by the Guardian Council. All thirty registered female candidates were promptly disqualified on constitutional grounds.

 Esfandiar Rahim Mashaei, Chief Staff of the President (2009-2012)
 Manouchehr Mottaki, Minister of Foreign Affairs (2005–2010)
 Ruhollah Ahmadzadeh, Head of Cultural Heritage Organization (2011–2012)
 Ali Fallahian, Minister of Intelligence (1989–1997)
 Parviz Kazemi, Minister of Welfare and Social Security (2005–2006)
 Abulhassan Navab, Chancellor of University of Religions and Denominations (since 1995)
 Alireza Zakani, Member of the Parliament (since 2004)
 Mohammad Saeedikia, Minister of Housing and Urban Development (2005–2009)
 Mohammed Bagher Kharrazi, Academic
 Ahmad Kashani, Member of the Parliament (1980–1988)

 Akbar Hashemi Rafsanjani, President (1989–1997)
 Tahmasb Mazaheri, Governor of Central Bank (2007–2008)
 Mostafa Kavakebian, Member of the Parliament (2004–2012)
 Ebrahim Asgharzadeh, Member of the Parliament (1988–1992)
 Akbar A'lami, Member of the Parliament (2000–2008)
 Elias Hazrati, Member of the Parliament (1988–2004)
 Ghasem Sholeh-Saadi, Member of the Parliament (1996–2008)
 Hassan Sobhani, Member of the Parliament (1996–2008)
 Hooshang Amirahmadi, Academic and political analyst

Declined
The following people did not register for the election and declined to enter the race.

 Mohammad-Ali Najafi, Minister of Education (1989–1997)
 Parviz Fattah, Minister of Energy (2005–2009)
 Mostafa Pourmohammadi, Minister of Interior (2005–2008)
 Mohammad-Reza Bahonar, Deputy Speaker of the Parliament (since 2011)
 Ali Larijani, Speaker of the Parliament (since 2008)
 Mehdi Chamran, Chairman of City Council of Tehran (since 2003)
 Mohammad Khatami, President (1997–2005)
 Gholam-Hossein Elham, Minister of Justice (2006–2009)

 Eshaq Jahangiri, Minister of Mines (1997–2005)
 Mohsen Mehralizadeh, Head of the National Sports Organization (2000–2005)
 Ali Akbar Salehi, Minister of Foreign Affairs (since 2010)
 Ali Nikzad, Minister of Transportation (since 2011)
 Bijan Namdar Zangeneh, Minister of Petroleum (1997–2005)
 Hamid Baqai, Head of Presidential Center (since 2011)
 Yahya Ale Eshaq, Minister of Commerce (1993–1997)
 Hossein Kamali, Minister of Labor (1988–1997)

Endorsements
While Rouhani is a high-ranking member of the Combatant Clergy Association, his candidacy in the election was not supported by CCA which has conservative tendency. He was supported by some moderate and reformist parties such as Moderation and Development Party and Islamic Iran Participation Front as well as Iranian reform movement's umbrella organization, Council for coordinating the Reforms Front. Rouhani's motto in the election is "E'tedal" which is translated to "Moderation" and he is described as a moderate politician by some western sources.
 19 October 2012 – 7 April 2013: 'Progress and Justice Population of Islamic Iran' selected three main conservative candidates as their nominates: Ghalibaf, Velayati and Haddad-Adel. Two of them will withdraw in favor of one.
 20–22 November 2012: House of Labour, Kamali won the nomination with no opponent. Kamali withdrew on 10 May 2013 and party supports Rouhani.
 10–15 January 2013: Democracy Party, Kavakebian won the nomination. Kavakebian's nomination was later rejected and party supports Rouhani.
 19–20 April 2013: Front of Islamic Revolution Stability, Bagheri Lankarani was elected as the coalition's main candidate. Lankarani withdrew five days after registered and coalition supports Jalili.
 5–9 May 2013: 'Conservatives Majority Alliance', Aboutorabi Fard won the coalition's vote but Mottaki declared he will not accept this selection and will run separately. After Aboutorabi Fard's withdrew and Mottaki's rejection, party supports Ghalibaf.
 11 May 2013: Executives of Construction Party, the party's mental leader Rafsanjani was registered but after Rafsanjani's rejection, party supports Rouhani.
 28 May 2013: Velayati, one of the three candidates of Progression Alliance, announced that all three candidates will be remain at the race but Haddad-Adel was withdrew on 10 June.

Campaign

Debates

From 25 May to 12 June 2013, each of the eight final candidates has the right to use National TV and Radio (IRIB) for their presidential election campaigns. In total, each candidate will use 405 minutes on Public TV and 285 minutes on Public Radio. This time comprises the candidates' own campaign programs as well as participation in the specific discussion shows. In addition, there will be three main live group debates on TV. The debates are held in three chapters: the first was held on 31 May, and second on 5 May and third on 7 May between all eight candidates. They differed from the previous election debates, which were held person-by-person. The 2013 debates and TV shows are moderated by Morteza Heidari and Hassan Abedini.

The following table shows the programme details and the time schedule for each candidate in Iranian Public TV. The times given are the local time (UTC +4:30 IRDT).

1 The first one-hour TV program of Mohammad-Reza Aref was cut after 15 minutes and did not continue. Later, the program was completely shown again on Friday, 31 May 2013.2 Haddad and Aref's programs were not shown because they withdrew.

State limits on the campaign

On 9 June Brigadier General Seyyed Masoud Jazayeri, Deputy Chief of Joint Armed Forces Headquarters and head of the Defense Propaganda Headquarters, "warned" a "few of the candidates" that "we have warned before that it's better that candidates express their opinions within the framework of presidency's authority, and avoid entering in those issues related to security or the armed forces." Jazayeri added that the Pasdaran will confront those candidates "who have spread untrue information and painted a black picture [of the regime], after the election."

According to the Campaign for Human Rights in Iran, Jazayeri was "alluding to the two reformist candidates in the race, Mohammad Reza Aref and Hassan Rouhani". (Aref withdrew from the race 11 June)

Also according to the Campaign, "several political activists and campaign workers have been arrested at political rallies, at their work places, and at their homes" since the beginning of June. In addition, "journalists and activists who had been imprisoned after the 2009 elections" and were later released on furlough "have been recalled to prison in the month leading to the election"

In the run-up to the election, the internet was drastically slowed down with poor connectivity and since March virtual private networks have been blocked, resulting in the inability of Iranians to access thousands of foreign websites, as well as Twitter and Facebook.

Opinion polls
The main online polls began after announcement of candidates' final list. The polls are divided into three main groups: field polls, telephone polls and internet polls.

IPOS polls
As one of the few telephone polling systems in Iran, IPOS (Iranian Elections Tracking Polls) institute ran a daily poll system for the election, by claiming that they have the only official poll system in Iranian presidential election. The poll is based on the daily phone interviews with a sample size of around 1,000 people per day. The poll also reported that between 60 and 75% of the people confirmed they will participate in the presidential election.

On 6 June 2013 Ghalibaf held a strong lead in the poll with the support of 39% of decided voters. However, the poll notified that 57% of voters are undecided, meaning that the poll result can be changed easily. Rezaee and Jalili had the second and third place with 16.8 and 13.9% of decided voters respectively.

On 10 June 2013 Ghalibaf still held a lead in the presidential race, but this time with the support of 27% of decided voters. Ghalibaf votes has started to decrease after the third national TV debate held on 7 June 2013. The percentage of undecided voters decreased to 47%. Jalili and Rezaee had the second and third place with 16.5 and 16% of decided voters respectively. Rouhani's votes started to increase after the third national TV debate reaching from 8 to 14%. After Aref's withdrawal on 11 June 2013 and decreasing the undecided voters percentage, some significant changes in the percentages are expected in the following days.

On 12 June 2013 Rouhani made a notable lead in the presidential race, reaching 32% of decided votes. Ghalibaf votes has continued to decrease to 24.4% of decided voters. The percentage of undecided voters decreased to 42%. Jalili, Rezaee and Velayati had the third to fifth place with a rally small margin of difference.

On 13 June 2013 in the final results, Rouhani reached 38% of decided votes. Ghalibaf votes remained on 25% of decided voters. The percentage of undecided voters decreased to 38.7%. Rezaee, Jalili and Velayati were in third to fifth place.

Results

According to the Ministry of Interior, 50,483,192 were eligible to vote in the first round. Over 66,000 polling stations were set up across the country. Expatriates were able to vote in 285 polling stations set-up in their respective countries. Due to its massive population, Tehran Province had the highest number of polling stations with over 17,000.

At 20:30 local time, the ministry announced Rouhani as the new president.

Split percentages are from the Ministry of Interior of Iran, based on all votes cast. This is because 50%+ of all votes is needed to win the first round.

Votes by provinces
The table below displays the official vote tallies by province.

Turnout
Officials said over 72 percent of over 50 million eligible Iranians turned out to vote.

Reactions
Prior to the election, the Foreign Ministry's spokesperson, Abbas Araghchi accused France and the United States of interfering in the electoral process after the two countries' officials criticised the nomination process and the disqualifications. Hours after the announcement of preliminary results, Ali Akbar Velayati and Mohammad Gharazi both conceded their loss in the election and congratulated the president-elect. Mohammad Reza Aref, the withdrawing candidate also published via his Twitter account, congratulating the new president and thanked people for voting for the reform movement. Hassan Rouhani, Mohammad Bagher Ghalibaf and Mohsen Rezaee's campaigns also thanked the nation on their high participation in the election. Tehran Stock Exchange's index also reached more than 46,000 units that was highest since February 2013. Supreme Leader, Ali Khamenei also congratulated Rouhani on his election as new president of the country.

Inauguration

The inauguration of Hassan Rouhani as the 7th President of Iran took place on two rounds, first on Saturday 3 August 2013 whereby he received his presidential precept from Supreme Leader and entered to the Sa'dabad Palace, official residence of the president in a private ceremony. The second was on the next day with sworn in for the office in the Parliament of Iran.

Maps

Gallery

References

External links

 Iran Electoral Archive
 Iran's 2013 Presidential Election Data

 
2013 elections in Iran
2013
June 2013 events in Iran
Iran